Lingfield railway station is on the  branch of the Oxted line in southern England and serves Lingfield in Surrey. The station is managed by Southern.

The station adjoins Lingfield Park Racecourse.

History 

The opening of the London, Brighton and South Coast Railway's (LBSCR) Oxted Line in 1884 brought the railway to the small agricultural parish of Lingfield which, like its neighbour Dormansland, had been earmarked for residential development. The area was also to be the location of a new racecourse which was to open in 1890. Lingfield originally had only limited facilities to accommodate passengers and freight, and struggled to deal with the crowds which attended the race meetings. A goods shed and loading dock were added in May 1884, and in 1894 the down platform became an island and the loading dock was extended to become a departure platform for race specials. The LBSCR obtained authorisation to construct a line directly to the racecourse in 1898, but these plans never materialised.

Goods traffic was at a peak during the interwar period, when the sidings saw a variety of interesting traffic. Horseboxes and cattle wagons were numerous, and during the war, it was a stabling point for an emergency tank train. A large banana ripening shed was opened in the late 1950s and this received supplies direct from Avonmouth Docks. This closed on 1 October 1971 as bananas were now containerised and transported by road. Race traffic has also decreased and the track layout was progressively simplified, leaving the remaining traffic to be dealt with by strengthening ordinary services. Further modifications were carried out in 1972 when the station was "modernised" by demolishing the goods shed and removing the down platform canopy. However, the main buildings, together with the adjoining stationmaster's house, have survived as good examples of an LBSCR country station.

Services 
Off-peak, all services at Lingfield are operated by Southern using  EMUs.

The typical off-peak service in trains per hour is:
 1 tph to  via 
 1 tph to 

During the peak hours and on weekends, the service is increased to 2 tph in each direction.

These services are operated using  EMUs.

References

External links 

Railway stations in Surrey
Former London, Brighton and South Coast Railway stations
Railway stations in Great Britain opened in 1884
Railway stations served by Govia Thameslink Railway